A Fingal County Council election was held in Fingal in Ireland on 24 May 2019 as part of that year's local elections. All 40 councillors were elected for a five-year term of office from 7 local electoral areas (LEAs) by single transferable vote.

Following a recommendation of the 2018 Boundary Committee, the boundaries of the LEAs were altered from those used in the 2014 elections. Its terms of reference required no change in the total number of councillors but set a lower maximum LEA size of seven councillors, breached by four of Fingal's five 2014 LEAs. Other changes were necessitated by population shifts revealed by the 2016 census.

Fianna Fáil emerged as the largest party with 8 seats a net gain on 1 seat. The party won 2 seats in each of Swords and Rush-Lusk. Following boundary changes with Brian Dennehy having transferred to Rush-Lusk the party emerged seatless in Balbriggan, however. Fine Gael also increased their seat numbers by 1 to 7 but failed to win a seat in Swords for another election as well as Rush-Lusk. Labour gained 2 seats to return with 6 seats in total. The Green Party gained 3 seats in Balbriggan, Ongar and Swords to increase their numbers to 5. Cian O'Callaghan and Paul Mulville had joined the Social Democrats in the years pre-election and both retained their seats. Sinn Féin lost 2 seats overall in Balbriggan and in Howth-Malahide. The party fared much better in the LEAs that make up the Dublin West constituency than Dubin Fingal and just took the last seat in Swords. Solidarity had a very poor election in a former heartland returning with just 1 seat.

The election was also notable for the victory of Ireland's first Indian-born councillor, Punam Rane, who was elected as a Fine Gael candidate in the in Blanchardstown Mulhuddart LEA. The Green gains included a 20-year-old student: Daniel Whooley. elected in the Ongar LEA.

Results by party

Results by local electoral area

Balbriggan

Blanchardstown–Mulhuddart

Castleknock

Howth–Malahide

Ongar

Rush–Lusk

Swords

Results by gender

Changes Since 2019 Local Elections

Footnotes

Sources

References

2019 Irish local elections
2019